Clemens Trimmel (born 8 June 1978) is a former professional tennis player from Austria.

Biography

Professional tour
Trimmel, a right-handed player from Vienna, was a top-50 ranked junior. He turned professional in 1997 and made several main draw appearances at ATP Tour tournaments. Most notably he had a first-round win over world number 23 Jonas Björkman at St. Pölten in 1997. At the same tournament the following year he narrowly lost to Thomas Muster, 5–7 in the final set. Muster was also his doubles partner at ATP Tour tournaments in Stuttgart and Kitzbühel. 

His only Challenger title came in 2000 at the Oberstaufen Cup, where he defeated Radomir Vasek in the final. He was unable to defend his title in 2001 but did have a win over David Ferrer. 

At the 2001 French Open he made it to the final round of qualifying, beating James Blake en route.

Davis Cup
The first of his two Davis Cup appearances for Austria was an away tie to Croatia in 2001. He played in the reverse singles, a dead rubber that he lost to Mario Ančić in a final set tie-break. His second Davis Cup match came in 2002, when Austria hosted Israel in Tyrol. He partnered Alexander Peya in the doubles, which they lost in five sets to Jonathan Erlich and Andy Ram.

In 2012 he was appointed Austria's Davis Cup captain and in his first year took the team to the World Group quarter-finals, for the first time since 1995. The Austrians were relegated in 2013 and after their 2014 campaign, in which they were unable to return to the World Group, Trimmel was replaced by Stefan Koubek. He also captained the Austria Fed Cup team in the 2014 season.

ATP Challenger and ITF Futures finals

Singles: 11 (6–5)

Doubles: 3 (1–2)

See also
List of Austria Davis Cup team representatives

References

External links
 
 
 

1978 births
Living people
Austrian male tennis players
Austrian tennis coaches
Tennis players from Vienna